The Sulphide Cabin, also known as the Frisco Cabin, is a log cabin located along Bridge Creek Trail in North Cascades National Park, in the U.S. state of Washington. Constructed sometime in the 1920s by A.H. Peterson and his nephew, the cabin was a warm season residence used while Peterson worked his mining claim. The cabin was constructed plainly of rounded hewn logs, half notched at the corners. Sulphide–Frisco Cabin was placed on the National Register of Historic Places in 1989 as it is the only remaining residence associated with mining in the Stehekin region of the park.

References

Houses on the National Register of Historic Places in Washington (state)
Houses completed in 1929
Buildings and structures in Chelan County, Washington
National Register of Historic Places in North Cascades National Park
Log cabins in the United States
National Register of Historic Places in Chelan County, Washington
Log buildings and structures on the National Register of Historic Places in Washington (state)